Chargé is a commune in the Indre-et-Loire department in central France.

Chargé is a small town near Amboise. The Rock 'in Chargé festival has revitalized the village since 2006.

Population
The inhabitants are called Chargéens.

See also
Communes of the Indre-et-Loire department

References

Communes of Indre-et-Loire